Sulejman Hoxha (born 13 February 1990) is an Albanian footballer who plays for German Oberliga Hamburg club FC Türkiye Wilhelmsburg as a goalkeeper.

Career
A product of the Dinamo Tirana academy, Hoxha was loaned out to Albanian First Division side KF Erzeni Shijak for the 2007–2008 season in order to gain first team experience for the first time. During his loan spell he made 20 league appearances but did not manage to help the club survive relegation as they failed to be beat the drop by a single point. In June 2008 he had an unsuccessful trial with German club TSV 1860 München, before returning to his parent club Dinamo Tirana and joining the first team there for the first time. Following a suspension for first choice goalkeeper Elvis Kotorri, Hoxha made his debut for Dinamo Tirana on 4 February 2009 in a local derby game against Partizani Tirana. Hoxha played the full 90 minutes but failed to keep a clean sheet in the 1–0 loss.

Hoxha left Dinamo in the summer of 2009 and joined fellow Albanian Superliga side Apolonia Fier where he became the team's first choice goalkeeper following the departure of Erjon Dine. During the 2009–2010 season he made 22 league appearances but the club finished in penultimate place and were subsequently relegated to the Albanian First Division, the second time he had experiences relegation in his career. He remained at the club despite relegation but eventually left to join newly promoted Albanian Superliga side KS Pogradeci in July 2010. He was the club's second choice goalkeeper behind the Macedonian Ilce Petrovski and he made 9 appearances in total, 7 of which came in the league. He experienced relegation for the third time as Pogradeci finished in penultimate place.

Hoxha then joined Teuta Durrës for the 2012–13 season but he was once again second choice, this time behind Bledjan Rizvani. He managed 7 appearances throughout the season but only 2 came in the league. In the summer of 2013 he joined newly promoted side Partizani Tirana where he was Alban Hoxha's understudy in goal.

References

External links
 

1990 births
Footballers from Durrës
Living people
Albanian footballers
Albania youth international footballers
Association football goalkeepers
FK Dinamo Tirana players
KF Erzeni players
KF Apolonia Fier players
KS Pogradeci players
KF Teuta Durrës players
FK Partizani Tirana players
Paniliakos F.C. players
FK Dubnica players
Kategoria Superiore players
Kategoria e Parë players
Landesliga players
Oberliga (football) players
Albanian expatriate footballers
Expatriate footballers in Greece
Albanian expatriate sportspeople in Greece
Expatriate footballers in Slovakia
Albanian expatriate sportspeople in Slovakia
Expatriate footballers in Germany
Albanian expatriate sportspeople in Germany